Edward Moore (born 17 March 1993) is a South African cricketer. He was included in the Eastern Province cricket team squad for the 2015 Africa T20 Cup.

He was the leading run-scorer in the 2017–18 CSA Provincial One-Day Challenge tournament for Eastern Province, with 331 runs in seven matches.

In September 2018, he was named in Eastern Province's squad for the 2018 Africa T20 Cup. He was the leading run-scorer for Eastern Province in the tournament, with 159 runs in four matches, He was also the leading run-scorer for Warriors in the 2018–19 CSA 4-Day Franchise Series, with 921 runs in ten matches. and he was also the leading run-scorer for Eastern Province in the 2018–19 CSA Provincial One-Day Challenge, with 260 runs in five matches. In April 2021, he was named in Eastern Province's squad, ahead of the 2021–22 cricket season in South Africa.

References

External links
 

1993 births
Living people
South African cricketers
Eastern Province cricketers
Place of birth missing (living people)
Warriors cricketers
People from Uitenhage
Cricketers from the Eastern Cape